Rhodesville, also known as Rhodes Mill, is an unincorporated community in Lauderdale County, in the U.S. state of Alabama.

History
Rhodesville is named for the Rhodes family, who were early settlers of the area from Newberry County, South Carolina. Spencer Rhodes operated a store, blacksmith shop, and mill in Rhodesville.  A post office was in operation under the name Rhodesville from 1889 to 1907.

References

Unincorporated communities in Lauderdale County, Alabama
Unincorporated communities in Alabama